The Homigot Lighthouse is an active lighthouse in Pohang, South Korea.

History
The lighthouse was built in 1903 after a Japanese ship sank nearby in 1901. The lighthouse, which is the tallest in South Korea, was designed by French architects and built by Chinese contractors, and was completed in December 1903. The lighthouse was built with bricks without the use of rebar despite its height; inside it is divided into six-storeys and each ceiling is decorated with pear tree flower in honor of the Joseon dynasty. The lighthouse is still active and operated by Ministry of Oceans and Fisheries.

References

1903 establishments in Korea
Lighthouses in South Korea
Lighthouses completed in 1903
Pohang